Juan Antonio "Maquinita" Merlos Cabrera (December 3, 1941  – December 6, 2014) was a Salvadoran football player and manager.

Club career
Nicknamed Maquinita, Merlos was snapped up by Águila at Racing San Miguel and took part in their promotion to the Primera División de Fútbol de El Salvador in 1958. He also won his and the club's first league title in 1959, scoring one of the goals in the first leg of the Final. He still is one of Águila's all-time top goalscorers after forming a formidable frontline partnership in the 1960s with players like Juan Francisco Barraza and Saúl Molina.

He also played for Municipal Limeño and Luis Ángel Firpo after leaving Águila.

Managerial career
After his playing career ended, Merlos coached Santiagueño and helped the team win the Primera division title. He also coached Luis Angel Firpo, Liberal and Municipal Limeno.

Personal life
He lived with his wife in Santiago de María. In July 2010 he spent three months in hospital and had his right foot and later his leg below the knee amputated due to arteriosclerosis. To cover the medical expenses, former teammates and colleagues organised a charity match between his old clubs Águila and Santiagueño. In January 2011 he was given a pension for life by the National Assembly for his contribution to Salvadoran football.

Honours
Primera División de Fútbol de El Salvador: 5
 1959, 1960, 1961, 1963, 1964

References

External links
LA FOTOGRAFÍA 10. ALEX CORDERO Y MAQUINITA MERLOS EN EL CD MUNICIPAL LIMEÑO - short bio 

1941 births
2014 deaths
People from San Miguel, El Salvador
Association football forwards
Salvadoran footballers
El Salvador international footballers
C.D. Águila footballers
C.D. Luis Ángel Firpo footballers
Salvadoran amputees
C.D. Luis Ángel Firpo managers
Salvadoran football managers